Amar Akbar Anthony is a 2015 Indian Malayalam-language comedy thriller film directed by Nadirshah and written by Bibin George and Vishnu Unnikrishnan. It stars Prithviraj Sukumaran, Jayasurya, Indrajith Sukumaran and Namitha Pramod. The music is composed by Nadirshah, while the background music is given by Bijibal. It was released on 16 October 2015.

The production of Amar Akbar Anthony was completed in 65 days. It earned a major commercial success at the box office. Its soundtrack was released by the Sony Music India.

Plot
The plot revolves around three bachelor friends, who live in the same colony in Kochi. Their struggle is to live a luxurious life and to visit Thailand. The bike-stunt master and travel agent, Faizal, is also living in the same colony. He receives several injuries when he met an accident while performing bike stunts. He is then admitted to a hospital where he meets other patients. Faizal explains the reason for the accident to the other patients by narrating a story about his three clients Amar, Akbar and Anthony. The three are best friends, who are living a middle-class life. 

Amar's father Ramanan works as a security officer at ATM counter, while his mother, Chandrika is a marriage broker, who arranges the marriage of orphan woman Resmiya, but Resmiya's husband runs off with her jewellery hence Resmiya arrives at Amar's house to stay with her kid Fathima whom they lovingly call Pathu. Akbar is a handicapped person, whose father, Stalin Mammali, is a bodybuilder while his mother Jameela is a housewife. Anthony works as a pizza delivery boy at a mall, and is an orphan where his stepfather Chakkappan found him left alone inside a movie theatre and lives with his step-parents.

All the friends have a common nemesis Nallavanyana Unni aka Unni. Apart from their usual work, they occasionally work as catering service boys for marriages and other functions under the supervision of Rejimon, whose grandmother usually engages herself with multiple social networking sites. She created a fake Facebook account and tried to make Amar fall in love with her. All three friends have a crush on Jenny, a bar dancer. They planned to take her to the beach in Thailand. Their only goal and dream is to visit Pattaya, Thailand. However, due to family issues, their aim gets delayed each time. 

Meanwhile, Amar's father met with an accident and is saved by Jadayi Sabu and the money which was saved by the three friends was spent on his father's treatment. Simultaneously, a man named Dhappan usually kidnaps small children and kills them. Amar, Akbar and Anthony often bump into the man, but they do not care much about it. Meanwhile, they were told that Pathu was murdered. They found her body in drainage. The cops suspects Dhappan, a Bengali worker and psychopath, who always tries to attract small girls, and bury them alive. The trio catches him and is about to kill them. 

However, CI Sethunath stops them and reveals that Dhappan didn't kill Pathu, and tells that Sanju, a boy in their neighbourhood (whom Pathu was scared off and used to complain, because of his unusual behaviour) witnessed the scene and the culprit was their respected colony leader Mash, who was very much loved by Pathu. They along with the villagers attacks him. Amar tells Resmiya to avenge according to her wish and she stabs Mash with a bottle. On the other side, Dhappan is being stabbed by the people along with Mash and Akbar beats him with a stick, which he throws above. This stick flies through the sky and gets stuck in a bike which was racing which was Faizal. 

Faizal discontinuous his story, where the patients liked his story. It is also revealed that Faizal is basically a travel agent at Pattaya tour and travel. Later, the trio starts CHILD PROTECTION AND WELFARE in Pathu's memory.

Cast

Prithviraj as Amar (Amarnath)
Jayasurya as Akbar (Akku)
Indrajith as Anthony (Thalapathy)
Asif Ali as Faizal (Extended Cameo)
Namitha Pramod as Jenny
Siddique as CI Sethunath V. R. (Cameo)
Saju Navodaya as Rejimon (Durantham Reji)
Baby Meenakshi as Fathima (Pathumma/Pathu)
Srinda Ashab as Resmina,  Fathima's Mother
Kalabhavan Shajohn as Jadayi Sabu
Sasi Kalinga as Ramanan, Amar's Father
Abu Salim as Stalin Mammali, Akbar's Father
Pradeep Kottayam as Chakkappan, Anthony's Father
V. K. Sreeraman  as Mash
K. P. A. C. Lalitha as Chandrika, Amar's Mother
Bindu Panicker as Jameela, Akbar's Mother
Priyanka Anoop as Anthony's Mother
Chali Pala as Sajeevan, police constable
Ramesh Pisharody as Nallavanaya Unni
Balaji Sharma
Sona Heiden as Sajeevan's Wife
Shafique Rahman as Dhappan
Dharmajan Bolgatty as 'Black' Suni
 Harimurali as Amalnath, Amar's Brother
 Ena Saha as Amar's Girlfriend
 Tarushi Jha as Amar's Girlfriend 
 Ponnamma Babu as Gauri's Mother
 Molly Kannamaly as Ammachy
 Pauly Valsan as Fish Seller
 Mareena Michael as Angel
Akanksha Puri as Gauri, Amar's Girlfriend (Cameo)
 Iniya as Item Dancer (Cameo)
 Vishnu Unnikrishnan as Rogue Man (Cameo) 
 Bibin George as Furniture Shop Employee (Cameo)
 Abdul Majeed as Pizza Shop Manager (Cameo)
 Sujith Vasudev as himself (Cameo)
 Thesni Khan as Nurse
 K.T.S. Padannayil as Patient
 Nandhu Pothuval as Swami

Production
Nadirshah made his successful debut with Amar Akbar Anthony. Mimicry artists, script writers along with Bibin and Vishnu completed the film screenplay in three years. They told the script to Nadirshah they knew for a long time. At listening to the script, Nadirshah showed interest.

However, it was completed in 65 days with an approximate production cost .

Remake
The film was remade in Kannada as John Jani Janardhan.

Release
The film was released on 16 October 2015 in India. The television satellite was sold to Surya TV. Sony Music India released the trailer on 5 October 2015. One day before the official release, its trailer was leaked on the video sharing website YouTube on 4 October which was later removed by the website. The trailer was viewed by the two lakh viewers in just two days.

Critical reception
International Business Times rated the film by 4/5. The film also revolves around the social issues and how to deal it. Sify.com stated that "How much you enjoy Amar Akbar Anthony will depend on your liking for loud, verbal comedy. Even if you are not a great fan of such jokes, this film can keep you entertained." Filmibeat rated the film 3 out of 5 calling it "comical extravaganza" The reviewer also noted that the film is indeed a good one that revolves around both comedy and social issues. . Malayala Manorama, a morning newspaper in Malayalam published from Kottayam, Kerala, rated 3 out of 5. According to the company, "As the film tries to capture everything in the running time. Nadhirshah skilfully maintains a pace in the plot and effortlessly switches between fillers, comedy and thriller, like a seasoned director".

Box office
At Kerala, the film earned  in 3 days and 52 lakhs from the rest of the other Indian states. It earned more than 11.20 crore within 8 days of its official release with a net amount of 9.02 crore. The film collected ₹50 crore from Worldwide box office in its final run. The film was played for over 100 days in Indian theatres.

Music

The audios were officially launched by Nivin Pauly and Dileep at an event which was organised by the filmmakers at Kochi on 9 October.

The first MP4 song "Premamennal" sung by Prithviraj Sukumaran, Indrajith Sukumaran, Jayasurya and Kalabhavan Shajon was released on 14 October by Sony Music India. The song "Yenno Njanente" featuring Baby Meenakshi is sung by Sreya Jayadeep was released on 22 October. The romantic song "Manjaadum" lyrics are written in  Malayalam, Hindi and Tamil.

Awards 
The film won the following awards:

Kerala State Film Awards
 Special Jury Mention - Baby Sreya

References

External links
 
 

2015 films
2010s Malayalam-language films
Indian comedy-drama films
Indian comedy thriller films
Films scored by Nadirshah
Films directed by Nadirshah
Malayalam films remade in other languages
Films shot in Kochi
Films shot in Thailand
2015 directorial debut films
2015 comedy-drama films